Dominique Anglade  (born January 31, 1974) is a businesswoman and a Canadian politician who served as the leader of the Quebec Liberal Party and Leader of the Opposition of Quebec from May 11, 2020 to December 1, 2022. She has served as a member of the National Assembly of Quebec from 2015 to 2022, representing Saint-Henri–Sainte-Anne. She is the first woman to lead the Quebec Liberal Party, the first black woman to lead a provincial party in Canada (at the federal level, Vivian Barbot was interim leader of the Bloc Québécois in 2011), and the first person of Haitian descent to be a cabinet minister in Canada. She is the daughter of the academic Georges Anglade. She was also the first woman CEO of Montréal International.

Early life and education
Anglade was born in Montreal to Georges and Mireille Neptune Anglade. Georges Anglade was a founder of the Université du Québec and a longtime geography professor there, as well as a special advisor to Haitian presidents Jean-Bertrand Aristide and René Préval. Mireille Neptune Anglade completed a PhD in economics and worked for NATO monitoring women's rights in Haiti.
Dominique Anglade spent much of her youth in Haiti, but returned to Canada to attend university.

Anglade holds an MBA from HEC Montréal and a Bachelor of Industrial Engineering from the École Polytechnique de Montréal. Before she entered politics, Anglade worked for the consulting firm McKinsey & Company in Montreal.

Political career

Coalition Avenir Québec
Anglade was formerly associated with the Coalition Avenir Québec. She ran as the CAQ candidate in Fabre in the 2012 election, losing to Liberal Gilles Ouimet. She served as the president of the CAQ from 2012 to 2013. She left that position to become CEO of Montreal International.

Quebec Liberal Party
In 2015, Anglade joined the Quebec Liberal Party, and stood as their candidate in a by-election for Saint-Henri–Sainte-Anne. She explained her political shift by citing objections to the CAQ's positions on ethnic identity and immigration. She was elected on November 9.

Anglade served in the cabinet of Philippe Couillard as the Minister of Economic Development, Innovation and Export Trade from 2016 to 2018. This made Anglade the first person of Haitian descent to exercise a ministerial function in Canada and the second woman in Canada. In 2017, Anglade was named Deputy Premier of Quebec, holding that office until the Liberal government's defeat in the 2018 election.

On June 27, 2019, following the departure of Philippe Couillard as party leader, Anglade announced her candidacy for the 2020 Quebec Liberal Party leadership election. She ran on a platform of returning the party to the Quebec nationalism within a framework of federalism associated with previous leaders Robert Bourassa and Jean Lesage. She also emphasized expanding the support base of the PLQ beyond Montreal, since the 2018 defeat of the Liberal Party was largely attributed to an overwhelming rejection by voters who lived outside of Montreal. To that end, she campaigned on a Charter of Regions that made dozens of specific commitments to communities across the province.

Anglade was named party leader on May 11, 2020, after her opponent, Alexandre Cusson (Fr), dropped out of the race. This made her the first woman to lead the Quebec Liberal Party, and the first black woman to lead a provincial party in Quebec.

Anglade announced her resignation as leader of the Quebec Liberal Party on November 7, 2022. She left the National Assembly on December 1. The provincial by-election to replace her was held on March 13, 2023, with Québec solidaire's Guillaume Cliche-Rivard winning the election.

Other activities
Anglade has served on the Board of Directors of several organisations including the Chamber of Commerce of Metropolitan Montreal, the United Way of Canada, and the Centre hospitalier universitaire Sainte-Justine.

Anglade's mother, father, uncle, and cousin were killed in the 2010 Haiti Earthquake. Following the earthquake, Anglade co-founded the organisation Kanpe (which is Haitian Creole for "stand up"), a charity to assist rural Haitians with rebuilding after the disaster.

Awards and recognition
Hommage Award, Ordre des ingénieurs du Québec (2011)
Toussaint-Louverture Prize, Young Haitian Chamber of Commerce (2013)
Laureate Prix Mérite (2017), L’Association des diplômés de Polytechnique, https://www.polymtl.ca/salle-de-presse/communiques/lassociation-des-diplomes-de-polytechnique-honore-dominique-anglade-claude-mc-master-et-lea-ricard L’Association des diplômés de Polytechnique (ADP)]
Young Global leader (2014), The World Economic Forum.  This distinction is awarded each year to the new generation of 40-and-under leaders from around the world who have been recognized for their professional achievements and their commitment to society. Ms. Anglade is the only Quebecker to have received this honor in 2014, among 214 honourees from 66 countries.

Electoral record

 
 
 

|}

References

1974 births
Living people
Quebec Liberal Party MNAs
Women MNAs in Quebec
Black Canadian politicians
Canadian anti-fascists
Canadian environmentalists
Canadian women environmentalists
Canadian feminists
Canadian people of Haitian descent
Black Canadian women
Businesspeople from Montreal
Coalition Avenir Québec politicians
Ecofeminists
Haitian Quebecers
Politicians from Montreal
Black Canadian businesspeople
Women government ministers of Canada
Members of the Executive Council of Quebec
21st-century Canadian politicians
21st-century Canadian women politicians
Deputy premiers of Quebec
Quebec political party leaders